The Homer News is a weekly newspaper published in Homer, Alaska since 1964.

The newspaper began circulation in January 1964. Founders Hall and Marion
Thorn had moved a few years earlier to Homer, where Hal's parents were
longtime residents. In the Thorns' hands, the Homer News was a product of
the battle over incorporation. Its own motto, "Aims for Progress," reflected
the views of those who saw incorporation as a step into the modern age.

Homer News switched its name to Homer Weekly News from 1973 to 1976 and back to Homer News on 1976.

Now 55 years later and several ownership changes later, the newspaper is
still serving the original goal of reporting the local news. The paper
reaches readers in every state and in several foreign countries, but the
target audience remains the people of Homer and surrounding Kachemak Bay
communities.

in 2000  Morris Communications acquired the Homer News. In 2017, Morris sold its newspapers to GateHouse Media. In 2018, GateHouse sold its Alaska papers to Sound Publications. The paper is issued every Thursday.

References

External links

 
 Morris Communications subsidiary profile of the Homer News

1964 establishments in Alaska
Homer, Alaska
Morris Publishing Group
Newspapers published in Alaska
Publications established in 1964